The Defence Infrastructure Service (Service d'Infrastructure de la Défense or SID) is a French body created at the end of 2005. It merges the three former entities in charge of Ministry of Defence buildings and properties:
Central Engineers' Directorate, or Direction Centrale du Génie (Armée de Terre),
Central Air Infrastructure Directorate, or Direction Centrale de l'Infrastructure de l'Air (Armée de l'Air)
Central Directorate of Maritime Properties and Works, or Direction Centrale des Travaux Immobiliers et Maritimes (Marine nationale).

Defence agencies of France
Defence estate management agencies